Allu Ramendran is a 2019 Indian Malayalam-language comedy thriller film directed by Bilahari and starring Kunchako Boban in the title role. The screenplay was written by Sajin Cherukayil, Vineeth Vasudevan, and Girish A. D., the film was produced by Ashiq Usman. Shaan Rahman composed the music. The film was released in India on 1 February 2019.

Plot 
Police driver Ramendran leads a typical life with his wife Viji, his father and sister Swathi. His jeep always gets a puncture with nails and is baffled as this happens only to him, but doesn't occur if anyone else is driving the vehicle. He is now on a quest to find out who puts the nails (allu) in his path, earning him the nickname Allu Ramendran.

One day while inspecting a puncture on the roadside he sees and almost catches the person who put the nails, but misses. After the scuffle Ramendran finds his wallet with a childhood photo in it but couldn't identify him. Due to all these mishaps, Ramendran is forced to go on leave. Meanwhile, his sister Swathi is in love with a young man named Jithu who is unemployed and is hopeful of an upcoming interview to Dubai. Jithu could not land the job as well seems to be shocked to realize Ramendran is Swathi's brother, which he was not aware till now. As the family starts to look for a suitable groom for Swathi, they plot a plan and ask Jithu to come home with the proposal as if in an arranged marriage.

Everything goes well until Swathi's family visit Jithu's home and Ramendran finds old photos of him. Ramendran confronts Jithu, and he confesses for keeping Spikes. On the day of his interview, Jithu had parked the bike in front of a tea shop, and Ramendran while chasing a runaway accused, had taken his bike, and in the heat of the moment leave it on the roadside, fallen. All of his certificates were soiled and hence to take revenge started to keep spikes for Ramendran's vehicle. Ramendran makes Jithu do many petty things like making two self-goals in the local football tournament, beg on the street etc., if Jithu wants to marry Swathi. Jithu does everything but at last Ramendran would still wont say yes to their marriage.

Ramendran now happy that his spike (Allu) nightmares are over rejoins his job, and on the first day while transporting a gun to the court gets a spike again. Alarmed, he and a fellow policeman will spot a person and chase him while the custodial gun gets stolen from the jeep. Ramendran is again on suspension and believes that Jithu has done this. During a local event, he spots the old accused, (he had relocated to Bangalore after the initial scuffle) and while following him is attacked by his goons. But Jithu will come to the rescue and the lost gun is found with the accused. Everything is finally settled and Jithu is married to Swathi.

At last Jithu and Ramendran set aside the differences and become family after the wedding. Finally, Ramendran is seen chasing a person whom he suspects of keeping spike for the wedding vehicle of Swathi and Jithu

Cast 

 Kunchacko Boban as "Allu" Ramendran
 Chandini Sreedharan as Viji, Ramendran's wife
 Krishna Shankar as Jithu, Swathi's Love interest
 Aparna Balamurali as Swathi, Ramendran's sister and Jithu's love interest
 Dharmajan Bolgatty as Ayyappadas
 Salim Kumar as SI Sinto Simon
 Sreenath Bhasi as Amruthesh
 Assim Jamal as Sathyan
 Hareesh Kanaran as Coach Vijayan
 Nadirsha as himself
 Sarasa Balussery as Jithu's grandmother 
 Althaf as Driver
 Krishna Prabha as Rany
 Rajesh Paravoor as Varghees
 Neeraj Madhav in a cameo appearance in song
 Nadirshah in a cameo appearance

Soundtrack 
The songs and score was composed by Shaan Rahman. Soundtrack was released by the label Muzik 247 on 18 February 2018.

Release
The film was released in India on 1 February 2019.

Critical reception
The Times of India rated the film 3 out of 5 stars and stated "The film is a good time-pass comedy, a wholesome family entertainer". The Deccan Chronicle considered the film to be "A throughout entertainer which won’t disappoint you" and rated the film 3 out of 5 stars. Malayala Manorama rated the film 3.5 out of 5 stars, saying "It is a tale with romance, comedy, suspense, action, drama, many flat tires and a hell of a lot of fun". Filmibeat rated the film 3.5 out of 5 stars and said that "with a thin-yet-interesting storyline and fresh narration, Allu Ramendran does join the league of well-crafted entertainers".

References

External links
 
 

2019 films
2010s Malayalam-language films
Films scored by Shaan Rahman